The Marquis of Ruvolito (Italian: Il marchese di Ruvolito) is a 1939 Italian "white-telephones" comedy film directed by Raffaello Matarazzo and starring Eduardo De Filippo, Peppino De Filippo and Leda Gloria. Based on a play of the same title by Nino Martoglio, it is set in Naples during the early 1900s. It is now considered a lost film.

The film's sets were designed by the art director Virgilio Marchi and Italo Tomassi. It was shot at Cinecittà Studios in Rome.

Cast
 Eduardo De Filippo as Il marchese di Ruvolito 
 Peppino De Filippo as Il marchese Erasmo di Mezzomondello 
 Rosina Anselmi as Donna Placida Cimosata 
 Elli Parvo as Immacolata - la figlia di Donna Placida 
 Leda Gloria as Lily Gordon 
 Virgilio Riento as Don Timurata 
 Turi Pandolfini as Neddu Grisi 
 Dina Perbellini as La contessa Scoperlati 
 Angelo Pelliccioni as Adolfo 
 Carla Sveva as Teresina 
 Armando Migliari as Il barone di Mezzomondello 
 Mercedes Brignone as La baronessa di Mezzomondello 
 Adele Mosso as Marianna 
 Eduardo Passarelli as Tanu Conti 
 Norma Nova as La cameriera 
 Tina Pica as Signorina Mangialardo

References

Bibliography 
 Goble, Alan. The Complete Index to Literary Sources in Film. Walter de Gruyter, 1999.

External links 
 

1939 films
Italian historical comedy films
1930s historical comedy films
1930s Italian-language films
Films directed by Raffaello Matarazzo
Films shot at Cinecittà Studios
Films set in Naples
Films set in the 1900s
1939 comedy films
1930s Italian films